Dirk John Vlug  (August 20, 1916 – June 25, 1996) was a United States Army soldier and a recipient of the United States military's highest decoration—the Medal of Honor—for his actions in World War II.

Biography
Vlug joined the Army from Grand Rapids, Michigan in April 1941. On December 15, 1944, while serving as a private first class in the 126th Infantry Regiment, 32nd Infantry Division, near Limon in the Philippine province of Leyte, Vlug single-handedly destroyed five enemy tanks. For his actions, he was awarded the Medal of Honor on June 26, 1946. He left the army and joined the Michigan National Guard in May 1949, retiring with the rank of Master Sergeant in January 1951.

Vlug died at age 79 and interred in Greenwood Cemetery, Grand Rapids, Michigan.

See also

List of Medal of Honor recipients
List of Medal of Honor recipients for World War II

References

External links 

1916 births
1996 deaths
American people of Dutch descent
United States Army personnel of World War II
United States Army Medal of Honor recipients
People from Grand Rapids, Michigan
United States Army soldiers
World War II recipients of the Medal of Honor
People from Maple Lake, Minnesota
Military personnel from Minnesota